Russell Lamar White (born December 15, 1970) is an American former professional football player who was a running back in the National Football League (NFL) for a single season in 1993.  White played college football for the California Golden Bears, and was recognized as an All-American.  Thereafter, he played professionally for the NFL's Los Angeles Rams.

Early years
White was born in Pacoima, California.  He graduated from Crespi Carmelite High School in Encino, California, where he played for the Crespi Carmelite Celts high school football team.  As a sophomore tailback in 1986, he led the team to a state championship, rushing for 256 yards in the championship game.  Slowed by injuries as a senior in 1988, he still gained 1,379 yards on the ground, caught 43 passes for 529 yards, scored 25 touchdowns, and was named to California Football's all-state team.  He completed his three high school seasons with 5,998 rushing yards, 94 touchdowns and 568 points—all California state high school records.  In 1986 and again in 1987, he was recognized as a high school All-American by USA Today and Scholastic Coach, and was also a two-time Cal Hi Sports California High School Football Player of the Year.

College career
White received an athletic scholarship to attend the University of California, Berkeley, where he played for the Golden Bears teams from 1990 through 1992.  He enrolled in 1989, but was ineligible to play as a freshman under the NCAA's Proposition 48 because he did not score high enough on the SAT college entrance exam.  Subsequently, diagnosed as suffering from dyslexia, he received tutoring and qualified academically to play in 1990.  In the Bears' 1990 season opener against the Miami Hurricanes on September 15, the first time he ever touched the ball in a college game, he returned a kickoff 99 yards for a touchdown.  As a junior in 1991, he rushed for 1,177 yards and 14 touchdowns, and was recognized as a consensus first-team All-American, having received first-team honors from the Football Writers Association of America and the Walter Camp Foundation.

During his three-season college career, he amassed 3,367 yards and a 5.1 yards-per-carry average to become the Golden Bears' all-time rushing leader.  He also scored 35 touchdowns on the ground—the most career rushing touchdowns in team history—and compiled fifteen games in which he rushed for 100 yards or more.  White graduated from the university in 1993 with a Bachelor of Arts degree in social welfare, and was inducted into the University of California Hall of Fame in 2003.

Professional career
He appeared in five games for the Rams, primarily as a kick returner.

Post-playing career
White was the athletic director and head football coach at Desert Chapel High School in Palm Springs, California where he led the Eagles to back to back CIF Division titles in 2002 and 2003.  White is now a teacher and was hired as the new head football coach at Castlemont High School in Oakland, California on April 30, 2010.  White is currently the commissioner of the Oakland Section of CIF. He was announced to be the new head football coach for Flintridge Preparatory School on March 18, 2016.

White is the nephew of former University of Southern California running back and Heisman Trophy winner Charles White, and the cousin of former UCLA and San Francisco 49er defensive back and kick returner Kermit Alexander.

References

1970 births
Living people
All-American college football players
American football running backs
California Golden Bears football players
Green Bay Packers players
High school football coaches in California
Los Angeles Rams players
Players of American football from Los Angeles
African-American coaches of American football
21st-century African-American sportspeople
20th-century African-American sportspeople